Golan may refer to:

Places
Iran
Golan, East Azerbaijan
Golan, Ilam
Golan, Kurdistan

Levant
Golan, an ancient city
Golan Heights, a disputed region captured by Israel from Syria
Golan Regional Council, an Israeli local government for its settlements in the Golan Heights

Sweden
 Gölan, a lake in Stockholm County

United Kingdom
Golan, County Tyrone, a townland in Carnteel, Northern Ireland
Golan, a municipality in Gwynedd, Wales

People
Given name
 Golan Cipel (born 1968), Israeli naval officer and former employee of New Jersey governor
 Golan Gutt (born 1994), Israeli basketball player
 Golan Hermon (born 1977), Israeli footballer
 Golan Levin (born 1972), American new-media artist
 Golan Maaka (1904–1978), New Zealand physician
 Golan Pollack (born 1991), Israeli Olympic judoka
 Golan Shahar (born 1968), Israeli psychologist

Surname
 Amit Golan (1964–2010), Israeli pianist, composer and educator
 Amos Golan, Israeli army officer and weapons designer
 Borja Golán (born 1983), Spanish squash player
 Erela Golan (born 1945), Israeli politician
 Eyal Golan (born 1971), Israeli singer
 Fred Golan, American television writer and producer
 Gila Golan (born 1940), Israeli film actress and Miss World contestant
 Idan Golan (born 1996), Israeli footballer
 Ishai Golan (born 1973), Israeli actor
 Itamar Golan (born 1970), Israeli pianist
 Lawrence Golan (born 1966), American conductor and violinist
 May Golan (born 1986), Israeli politician and social activist
 Menahem Golan (1929–2014), Israeli film actor and director
 Oded Golan (born 1951), Israeli engineer and antiquities dealer
 Omer Golan (born 1982), Israeli football player
 Ora Golan, Israeli chiropractor
 Pinhas Golan (1924–2016), Israeli Holocaust survivor and artist
 Rosi Golan, Israeli singer-songwriter
 Ross Golan (born 1980), American songwriter
 Tamar Golan (1933–2011), Israeli journalist
 Tomáš Goláň (born 1968), Czech senator
 Yair Golan (born 1962), Israeli general
 Yaron Golan (1949–2007), Israeli publisher
 Yuval Golan (born 1962), Israeli materials scientist
 Zev Golan, Israeli historian
 Zion Golan (born 1955), Israeli singer

Other uses 
 Golan (cycling race), a defunct road bicycle race
 Golan (game), a wargame
 Golan (horse), a thoroughbred racehorse
 Golan v. Holder, a U.S. copyright case
 Golan Armored Vehicle, a US-Israeli military vehicle
 Golan pistol, an Israeli firearm
 Golan Telecom, an Israeli mobile network operator
 Golan the Insatiable, a television series
 Golan Trevize, a character in Isaac Asimov's Foundation series